The 2018–19 Serbian Cup season was the thirteenth season of the Serbian national football cup competition. It started on 12 September 2018, and ended on 23 May 2019.

Calendar

Preliminary round

Round of 32

Round of 16

Quarter-finals

Semi-finals

First legs

Second legs

Final

Top goalscorers

References

External links
 Official site

Serbian Cup seasons
Cup
Serbian Cup